Known as RUN, Giacomo Bufarini is a London based Italian artist whose works can be seen adorning streets from China to Senegal. His recognisable style shows a level of detail and complexity rarely seen in street art today, evidenced through his vivid rendering of interlocking bodies in symbolic poses, pattern like, friezes in bright, arresting colours.

Overview
Giacomo Bufarini (aka RUN) is interested in street art as a language of communication, creating playful characters that speak to diverse audiences on multiple levels. The expansive scale of his works captivates the viewer, affecting a renaissance of muralism that reaches beyond the boundaries of street art.

He started graffiti painting on lorries, trains and walls when he was very young and his first big wall painting was in 2003. His inspiration comes from freedom, originality and quality.
RUN’s name is inspired by a Cypress Hill song and for him it is like having a tattoo when you are young, which does not necessarily have a deep meaning, but stays on your skin forever.

Exhibitions
In May 2013, Giacomo Bufarini (aka RUN) exhibited at the Dulwich Festival.

RUN's first solo exhibition has been held at Howard Griffin Gallery, Shoreditch, London from November 2014 till the beginning of February 2015. “Parabola Di G” is a semi-autobiographical story told through a unique series of highly detailed pen and ink drawings that collectively make up a book. The imagery follows the journey of a semi-fictional character, G, as he falls through levels of reality into a dreamscape.

In September 2014, RUN opened his second solo show entitled 'Man is God' at Howard Griffin Gallery, Los Angeles.

Murals
In June 2013, RUN painted on the Village Underground wall in Shoreditch, London

RUN's latest addition to London's neighbourhood of Clapton is a mural in Lower Clapton, painted along with Mexican artist Pablo Delgado.

In February 2014, RUN teamed up with Sheffield-based artist Phlegm and Christiaan Nagel on a mission to give final moments of vivacious life to yet another to be demolished building in London - the Blithehale Medical Centre in Bethnal Green.

References

External links
Official website

Living people
Artists from London
Street artists
Italian contemporary artists
Year of birth missing (living people)